Western Monmouthshire (also known as the Western Division of the County of Monmouth) was a parliamentary constituency in Monmouthshire.  It returned one Member of Parliament (MP) to the House of Commons of the Parliament of the United Kingdom.

History
The constituency was created by the Redistribution of Seats Act 1885 for the 1885 general election. It was abolished for the 1918 general election.

Boundaries 

The constituency was defined as comprising the "Sessional Division of Bedwellty (except the Parishes of Bedwas and Mynyddislwyn)", and thus constituted the following civil parishes:
Abertillery
Aberystruth (including part of Ebbw Vale)
Bedwellty (including Manmoel, Rhymney, Tredegar and part of Ebbw Vale)

On abolition by the Representation of the People Act 1918, West Monmouthshire's area was divided between three constituencies: Abertillery, Bedwellty and Ebbw Vale.

Members of Parliament

Elections

Elections in the 1880s

Elections in the 1890s

Elections in the 1900s

Elections in the 1910s 

General Election 1914–15:

Another General Election was required to take place before the end of 1915. The political parties had been making preparations for an election to take place and by the July 1914, the following candidates had been selected; 
Labour: Thomas Richards
Unionist:

References 

History of Monmouthshire
Historic parliamentary constituencies in South Wales
Constituencies of the Parliament of the United Kingdom established in 1885
Constituencies of the Parliament of the United Kingdom disestablished in 1918
Politics of Monmouthshire